The Chevrolet Trax is a crossover SUV manufactured by General Motors and marketed under the Chevrolet brand since 2013. The first generation model was released globally in 2013 as the smallest, entry-level crossover SUV offering from the brand. 

Development and production were centered in South Korea by GM Korea. A restyled model was also produced as the Buick Encore in North America and as the Opel/Vauxhall Mokka in Europe. 

In several markets, the vehicle was marketed as the Chevrolet Tracker, and as the Holden Trax in Australia and New Zealand. The Trax became available in Canada, Mexico, Germany, South Korea, Lebanon, United Arab Emirates, and Europe for the 2013 model year and was released in the U.S. for the 2015 model year.

In 2019, GM released the replacement of the Trax for China and Latin America, the Tracker. The first-generation Trax continued to be sold in North America, South Korea, and several other markets until 2022, when it was replaced by the larger second-generation Trax due for the 2024 model year. The second-generation Trax is also marketed in China as the Chevrolet Seeker.



First generation (U200; 2013) 

The first-generation Trax (model code U200, designated TJ in Australia) was first shown as a concept car, which was first unveiled at the 2012 Paris Motor Show, with the final model unveiled at the 2013 North American International Auto Show. It was then available for test driving at the 2013 Montreal International Auto Show, with four essay models shown.

The SUV was in development since 2008 by GM’s small vehicle development team centered in South Korea. It is based on the GM Gamma II platform, which is shared with the Chevrolet Aveo/Sonic and the Opel Mokka/Buick Encore. It was marketed as the Holden Trax in Australia and as the Chevrolet Tracker in Russia and South America. For most global markets, the Trax was produced by both GM Korea and GM Mexico. SAIC-GM also produced the model for the Chinese market from the 2015 model year until 2020. GM Uzbekistan also be produced this model starting in late 2018.

During 2013 and early 2014, the Trax was only sold in Canada, Mexico, Germany, South Korea, Lebanon, United Arab Emirates, and Europe.

In Canada, the Trax was the first compact Chevrolet crossover SUV since the discontinuation of the Tracker (read below). The vehicle started shipping on April 2, however, pre-sales began as early as the fourth quarter of 2012 for both Mexico (1.8 L) and Canada (1.4 L turbo). Sales in South Korea started in late February 2013.

In late 2014, the Trax was marketed to more countries including China, Indonesia and the Philippines.

Markets

South Korea 
The Trax was introduced in South Korea in February 2013. It is powered by the 1.4 L turbocharged gasoline engine. In 2015, a 1.6-litre diesel engine was added. The facelift model was introduced in October 2016.

It was the most exported car of South Korea in 2016, 2017, and 2018.

United States 
The Trax came to the United States as a 2015 model, due to the success of the Buick Encore (the Trax and Encore share the GM Gamma II platform) and possible competition from the Jeep Renegade; GM initially had no plans to offer the Trax to the US market. The US-market Trax is largely unchanged from the global version, but has some US-specific features including OnStar with AT&T 4G LTE and SiriusXM satellite radio.

Trailer towing is not recommended. Only the 6-speed automatic transmission is available.

Three trim levels, both available with front-wheel-drive and all-wheel-drive, are available: LS, LT, and LTZ.

2017 refresh
Chevrolet performed a mid-cycle update on the Trax for the 2017 model year, first unveiled at the 2016 Chicago Auto Show on February 12, 2016. The updated Trax carried design cues from the Malibu and Volt, including new halogen projector headlights, LED daytime running lights, dual taillights, and a new grille design. A set of 18-inch aluminum wheels are offered on the Premier model trim. The interior is also redesigned with a new dashboard and center instrument panel. Overall, the 2017 facelift improves Trax's perceived quality. The 2017 Trax went on sale in the fall of 2016.

The Trax continued unchanged for the 2020 model year in North America. It was joined by a slightly larger model, the Trailblazer (no relation to the previous North American or international mid-sized SUVs of the same name).

For the 2021 model year, the base L and high end Premier levels were removed from the offering trims, leaving the bottom tier LS and now top tier LT.

Name variations

Holden Trax (2013–2020) 
In Australia and other Oceania markets, the Chevrolet Trax was offered under the Holden brand until that brand was discontinued in 2020. It went on sale in 2013.

Chevrolet Tracker 
In Russia and South America, the Trax is instead named the Chevrolet Tracker, which was the name used in North and Latin America from 1989–1991 and 1999–2008 for a Chevrolet/Geo version of the Suzuki Sidekick.

Engines 
The Trax is offered in different markets with different choices of drivetrains. In Latin America the Trax is only available with the 1.8 L gasoline engine. In Canada and the US, only the 1.4 L turbocharged gasoline engine is offered. In Mexico and Australia (from 2015) it is available both in 1.8 and 1.4 L turbocharged engines. European customers can choose between the 1.4 L turbo gasoline engine, a 1.6 L gasoline engine, and a 1.7 L Diesel engine.

Discontinuation 
In China and South America, the first-generation Trax was discontinued and replaced by the Tracker in 2019. It is similar in size to the Trax, but built on a new platform (GEM) for emerging markets and not intended for North America.

General Motors discontinued the first-generation Trax, as well as the related Buick Encore, following the 2022 model year in North America.

Second generation (2023) 

The second-generation Trax was first unveiled in China in July 2022 as the Chevrolet Seeker. The North American second-generation Trax was revealed in October 2022 as a 2024 model, with sales to begin in the second quarter of 2023. It is larger than the previous model with a lower height. While being larger than the Trailblazer crossover, the Trax is priced below it. Chevrolet expects a $5,000 lower average transaction price compared to Trailblazer.

In North America, the second-generation Trax is offered in five trim levels: LS, 1RS, LT, 2RS, and Activ. The RS grades have a different grille and body trim. The Activ gets accents with a titanium-chrome finish and a faux rear skid plate. All-wheel drive is no longer offered. The U.S.-market Trax will continue to be built in South Korea.

Sales

References

External links

 

Trax
Cars introduced in 2012
2020s cars
Front-wheel-drive vehicles
All-wheel-drive vehicles
Mini sport utility vehicles
Crossover sport utility vehicles